Summer Solstice is a 2005 German-produced two-part television film, a sequel to the 2000 novel Winter Solstice by Rosamunde Pilcher, which was made a television film in 2004. The film, however, is not based on a novel, but was written by Pilcher directly for the screen. It stars Jason Durr, Jacqueline Bisset, Sinéad Cusack, Honor Blackman and Franco Nero.

Plot
Summer Solstice continues the story from Winter Solstice three years later, in the summertime. As then, the story is set in the Scottish Highlands. Sam and Carrie's newly formed business empire is struggling. The exclusive Rhives Castle Hotel is not attracting enough guests and The Langmore and Highland Gazette, the local newspaper which they own, has run a potentially libellous story concerning best-selling author, Alexia White. On top of everything Carrie has news which surprises Sam. Elfrida gets her big break when she is offered a small part in a soap opera, however, this is going to mean more time away from her beloved Oscar. Meanwhile Lucinda, The Countess of Rhives, is enjoying her new-found lease of life away from the burden of running the castle.

Release
The film was first shown on ZDF in Germany on 25 December 2005. In the United Kingdom, it first received a straight-to-DVD release in 2006, but was later broadcast by Channel 5, with the first airing on 11 June 2012.

References

External links

British television films
2005 films
2005 television films
German television films
2005 romantic drama films
Films shot in Edinburgh
English-language German films
Television shows based on British novels
ZDF original programming
Films directed by Giles Foster